Ascalenia grisella is a moth in the family Cosmopterigidae. It is found in Armenia.

The larvae feed on Tamarix species, creating a stem gall.

References

Moths described in 1930
Ascalenia
Moths of Europe
Moths of Asia